Denkaosan Kaovichit a.k.a. Denkaosan Redbull Gym.  a.k.a. Denkaosan Singwangcha (Thai: เด่นเก้าแสน เก้าวิชิต, เด่นเก้าแสนกระทิงยิม, เด่นเก้าแสน สิงห์วังชา; born, August 23, 1976) is a professional boxer from Thailand, the interim WBA Super Flyweight World champion and former WBA Flyweight World champion. He is also a Muslim.

Career history
Kaovichit began fighting professionally in 1996. After achieving an undefeated streak of 21 victories, he challenged Eric Morel for WBA flyweight championship on October 12, 2002. But after being knocked down twice in the 11th round, the referee stopped the bout. This was his first-ever defeat.

After winning 20 consecutive matches, Kaovichit got another on the same title. This time, it was against Takefumi Sakata on November 4, 2007. The match, however, resulted in a draw.

Following 5 wins in a row, he got a third shot at the title. Kaovichit battled Sakata again on December 31, 2008 and exacted revenge. He won the championship by besting the Japanese fighter in just two rounds.

On his first defense of that title which was held in his homeland, Kaovichit escaped with a narrow split decision against Hiroyuki Hisataka on May 26, 2009.

Kaovichit won his second title defense on October 6, 2009 by a majority decision over Daiki Kameda.

References

External links

|-

|-

1976 births
Living people
Flyweight boxers
World Boxing Association champions
Denkaosan Kaovichit
Denkaosan Kaovichit
Denkaosan Kaovichit
Denkaosan Kaovichit
Denkaosan Kaovichit